Nikoloz Basilashvili was the defending champion, but chose not to defend his title.

Evgeny Donskoy won the title, defeating Ričardas Berankis 6–4, 6–4 in the final.

Seeds

Draw

Finals

Top half

Bottom half

References
 Main Draw
 Qualifying Draw

Israel Open - Singles
Israel Open